The Lloydminster Bobcats are a Canadian junior A ice hockey team in the Alberta Junior Hockey League (AJHL).  They play home games in the Lloydminster Centennial Civic Centre on the Saskatchewan side of the biprovincial city of Lloydminster, which straddles that province's border with Alberta.

History
The Bobcats were preceded by the Lloydminster Blazers from 1988 to 2005 and the Saskatchewan Junior Hockey League's Lloydminster Lancers from 1982 until 1988. The Bobcats hosted the 2016 Royal Bank Cup tournament for the Junior A national championship.

Season-by-season record
Note: GP = Games played, W = Wins, L = Losses, T/OTL = Ties/Overtime losses, SOL = Shootout losses, Pts = Points, GF = Goals for, GA = Goals against

Junior A National Championship
The National Junior A Championship, known as the Centennial Cup and formerly as the Royal Bank Cup or RBC Cup, is the postseason tournament for the Canadian national championship for Junior A hockey teams that are members of the Canadian Junior Hockey League. The tournament consists of the regional Junior A champions and a previously selected host team. Since 1990, the national championship has used a five-team tournament format when the regional qualifiers were designated as the ANAVET Cup (Western), Doyle Cup (Pacific), Dudley Hewitt Cup (Central), and Fred Page Cup (Eastern). From 2013 to 2017, the qualifiers were the Dudley Hewitt Cup (Central), Fred Page Cup (Eastern), and the Western Canada Cup champions and runners-up (Western #1 and #2).

The tournament begins with round-robin play between the five teams followed by the top four teams playing a semifinal game, with the top seed facing the fourth seed and the second facing the third. The winners of the semifinals then face each other in final game for the national championship. In some years, the losers of the semifinal games face each other for a third place game.

NHL alumni
The following former Blazers or Bobcats have gone on to play in the NHL:

Scott Bailey
David Dziurzynski
Scott Hartnell
Wade Redden
Mike Siklenka

See also
 List of ice hockey teams in Alberta
 List of ice hockey teams in Saskatchewan
 Lloydminster Border Kings

References

External links
Lloydminster Bobcats website
Alberta Junior Hockey League website

Alberta Junior Hockey League teams
Ice hockey teams in Saskatchewan
Sport in Lloydminster
Saskatchewan Junior Hockey League teams
Ice hockey clubs established in 1982
1982 establishments in Saskatchewan